Long Hanborough is a village in Hanborough civil parish, about  northeast of Witney in West Oxfordshire, England. The village is the major settlement in Hanborough parish. The 2011 Census recorded the parish's population as 2,630.

History
An infants' school was built in 1879 and enlarged in 1893. It closed in 1998 and was merged into Hanborough Manor School. The old school building has been converted to a private house.  Christ Church Church of England parish church was built in 1893. It is now part of the Benefice of Hanborough and Freeland.  The village also has a Methodist church in which Reverend Samuel New resides.

The Oxford, Worcester and Wolverhampton Railway was built to the north of Long Hanborough in 1853, with Handborough Station (recently renamed Hanborough Station) opened just to the east of Long Hanborough  to serve the village. The franchisee, Great Western Railway, offers services to Oxford, London (Paddington), Worcester and Hereford. In 1935 the Great Western Railway opened a small station on the Combe Road to serve , although as near Long Hanborough as Combe, and with a very limited service.  On 30 January 1965 a funeral train with the coffin of Sir Winston Churchill was hauled to Hanborough Station by Battle of Britain Class locomotive 34051 Winston Churchill. From Hanborough the funeral cortège proceeded to St Martin's Church, Bladon where the funeral took place and Churchill was buried.

There have been several sightings of 2 big cats over the years. Believed to be Jaguars. It is said that the 8th duke of Marlborough released a number of these cats in his 9 years in office.

Amenities

Long Hanborough has a post office, a GP's practice, a dental practice, a Co-Operative store, a fish and chip shop and a bicycle repair shop. It has two pubs, the Three Horseshoes and the George & Dragon. Until the 2000s it had two other pubs. In 2009 the Swan, in Millwood End, was a gastropub, but it has since ceased trading and is now a private home. The Bell was controlled by Greene King Brewery but is no longer trading.

The parish still has a primary school: Hanborough Manor Church of England School.  Next to Hanborough railway station are Oxford Bus Museum and the Morris Motors Museum. The bus museum has a collection of 40 historic buses and coaches that operated in Oxfordshire, plus relics of Oxford's former horse tramways. The Morris Motors museum has a dozen historic vehicles built by Nuffield Organization companies, mainly Morris Motors.  Hanborough has a Women's Institute.

Buses
Long Hanborough has two bus services run by Stagecoach in Oxfordshire. Route S7 runs twice an hour, Mondays to Sundays between Oxford and Witney. Route 233 runs twice an hour, Mondays to Saturdays between Woodstock and Burford via Long Hanborough and Witney.  Both routes pass Hanborough rail station.

References

External links

Villages in Oxfordshire
West Oxfordshire District